The Orto Botanico di APS Parco Domingo Comunità Empatica e Sostenibile Bari, also known as the Orto Domingo, Orto dei Miracoli, and Hortus Botanicus Barensis, is a botanical garden in Bari, Apulia, Italy.

It is operated by the APS Parco Domingo and is open Monday through Friday mornings. The site includes a greenhouse and a herbarium with about 40,000 specimens. The garden collections include:
 Aizoaceae Lithops (about 60 taxa) and similar genera (Conophytum, Dinteranthus, and Gibbaeum)
 Orchidaceae 33 taxa from the districts of Puglia Gargano, Murgia North-West, Salento and Valle d'Itria. Genera include Aceras, Barlia, Cephalanthera, Dactylorhiza, Himantoglossum, Ophrys, Orchis, Platanthera, and Serapias
 Ornamental and useful plants Collections of Cycadaceae, Leguminosae, and Musaceae. About 115 taxa of mainly Italian flora, including Grindelia robusta, Levisticum officinale, and Rumex acetosa
 Arecaceae including Arecastrum romanzoffianum, Butia capitata, Chamaerops humilis, Erythea armata, Jubea chilensis, Livistona chinensis, Rhapis humilis, Sabal palmetto, Phoenix roebelenii, Phoenix dactylifera, Phoenix canariensis, Trachycarpus fortunei, and Washingtonia filifera
 Pugliesi plants regional plants including Campanula garganica, Cistus clusii, and Viola graeca

See also 
 List of botanical gardens in Italy

Botanical gardens in Italy
Gardens in Apulia